Shaheed Tajuddin Ahmad Medical College is a government medical school in Bangladesh, established in 2013. It is located in Gazipur. The college is affiliated with University of Dhaka as a constituent college.

It offers a five-year MBBS degree programme and admits 72 students every year.

History
The college was formed as Gazipur Medical College. On 18 November 2013, it was renamed in August 2014. It was named after Tajuddin Ahmad, the first prime minister of Bangladesh.

See also
 List of medical colleges in Bangladesh

References

Medical colleges in Bangladesh
Hospitals in Bangladesh
Educational institutions established in 2013
2013 establishments in Bangladesh